Dietfurt, now part of the town of Treuchtlingen, is a German village in Middle Franconia, Bavaria. Prior to 1853 it was for centuries the location of an important post station on the road between Augsburg and Nuremberg.

Personalities
The 18th-century ornithologist Johann Heinrich Zorn was pastor of Dietfurt.

References

External links

Villages in Bavaria
Weißenburg-Gunzenhausen